Estarkhi, also rendered as Estakhri, may refer to:
 Estakhri, Fars
 Estarkhi, Faruj, North Khorasan Province
 Estarkhi, Shirvan, North Khorasan Province

See also
Estakhr
Estarkh